The Three Ts in the context of China are Taiwan, Tibet, and Tiananmen. These are the three most contentious issues to the Chinese Communist Party (CCP). They have also been referred to as the Forbidden Ts.

Overview
Foreigners are advised not to raise these topics in discussion with Chinese citizens as this could put them in an "uncomfortable" situation.

Journalist Eveline Chao said that she was told to avoid stories about the Three Ts in China.

Academics at British Universities have faced pressure to avoid the Three Ts and praise the CCP. They were threatened with the cancellation of their Chinese visas which would have ended their ability to do research in China.

Variants

The Two Ts
For businesses only two of the three Ts are generally relevant, Tibet and Taiwan. Foreign companies operating in China must be careful to avoid appearing to violate the party line on either topic. As many large businesses benefit from outsourced Chinese labor, they are unable to speak up about the human rights violations in China without angering the CCP and likely losing their profits within China. This occurred in 2019, when Daryl Morey of the Houston Rockets tweeted in support of Hong Kong's protesters, a contentious issue the CCP wishes to shut down. After threats from China, the tweet was deleted and the NBA apologized.

The Three Ts and Two Cs
The Three Ts and Two Cs is an alternate formulation with the same Three Ts with the addition of “cults” (a euphemism for Falun Gong) and “criticism” of the CCP.

See also
 Overseas censorship of Chinese issues
 Censorship in China
 Organ harvesting from Falun Gong practitioners in China

References

Overseas censorship of Chinese issues
Chinese Communist Party
1989 Tiananmen Square protests and massacre